Mustafa Doğan (born 1 January 1976) is a German former professional footballer of who played as a central defender. During his professional career, he played for teams in both Turkey, the country of his birth, and Germany, representing the Germany national team in 1999.

Club career 
A native of the village of Dedeçam, in Yalvaç district, Isparta, Doğan started his career playing for TV Asberg, a small German club. At 13, he signed his first professional contract, with KFC Uerdingen 05, having made his first-team debut on 15 May 1994, in a second division match at Wuppertaler SV.

In 1996, Doğan transferred to Istanbul's Fenerbahçe SK. He stayed there for seven years, the first five as a starter, then switched back to Germany, signing with Bundesliga outfit 1. FC Köln. On 18 October 2003, he netted his sole top flight goal, in a 1–0 home win against SC Freiburg.

Beşiktaş J.K. took it upon themselves to bring the defender back to the Turkish first division and signed Doğan in 2004–05. Hampered by several injuries, he retired in 2007, at 31.

International career 
After also having represented Germany's U21, Doğan was fully capped twice by his adoptive nation in 1999, the first in July, a 2–0 defeat with the United States in the FIFA Confederations Cup, playing his second and last three months later in a UEFA Euro 2000 qualifier against, of all the teams, Turkey. A goalless home draw was the outcome.

Media career 
After retiring, Doğan worked as football commentator for Turkish sports television NTV Spor.

References

External links
 
 
 
 

1976 births
Living people
People from Isparta
German footballers
Turkish footballers
Naturalized citizens of Germany
Association football defenders
Germany international footballers
Germany B international footballers
Germany under-21 international footballers
Germany youth international footballers
1999 FIFA Confederations Cup players
Turkish emigrants to Germany
Bundesliga players
2. Bundesliga players
KFC Uerdingen 05 players
1. FC Köln players
Süper Lig players
Fenerbahçe S.K. footballers
Beşiktaş J.K. footballers